Kaliyil Alpam Karyam is a 1984 Indian Malayalam-language film directed by Sathyan Anthikad, starring Mohanlal, Neelima Azeem (actress),  Rahman, Jagathy Sreekumar and Lizy (actress)Lizy in the lead roles. The film was shot in different parts of Ernakulam district. The village Manikulangara in the film was shot in various parts of Muvattupuzha.

Plot
Vinayan Mohanlal comes from a rich family, but he cannot stand modern lifestyle. His brother babu(Rahman) spends time dancing at clubs, his sister Kalpana(Lizy) always listens to the radio, and his parents are always busy. He gets tired of life in the city and moves to a village, taking a small job as a village extentsion officer. There, he falls in love with a village girl Radha( Neelima), but she is just the opposite of Vinayan and she wants to enjoy the luxurious life in a city. Vinayan marries Radha without he consent of his parents. When his parents know about the same, they soon take him to city. Radha with her parents and Vinayan's brother Babu reaches the city and soon she lives in the house as their daughter in law. But now Vinayan finds that his wife is only interested in luxurious life and not much in him. He directs her to accompany him to village where he works. But she refuses and soon they part. Vinayan continues in the village, while his wife continues in the city. After a while, she understands that her village life was far better and returns to her own village and the couple reunites.

Cast
Mohanlal as Vinu / Vinayan
Bhuvana/Neelima in Stage as Radha
Bahadoor as Rarichan Nair
Sankaradi as Sankaran Nair
Meena as Lekshmi Nair
Jagathy Sreekumar as Vaasunni
Rahman as Babu
K. P. Ummer
Sukumari as Leela
Lizy as Kalpana
Nedumudi Venu as a drunk neighbour
Mala Aravindan as Shankarankutty
Thrissur Elsy
Master Aravind/M. P. Ramnath
Kunchan as Kochukuttan, Vaasunni's friend

Soundtrack
The music was composed by Raveendran and the lyrics were written by Sathyan Anthikkad.

References

External links
 

1980s Malayalam-language films
1980s romance films
Films directed by Sathyan Anthikad
Indian romance films